Brightly is a historic plantation house located near Goochland, Goochland County, Virginia.  The main dwelling was built about 1842, and is a two-story, single pile, central-passage-plan, gable-roofed brick dwelling in the Greek Revival style. The front facade features a one-story, one-bay Greek Revival Doric order porch.  Also on the property are the contributing pair of slave dwellings, privy, granary, chicken house, barn, well house, windmill, cemetery and the gate posts.

The house now serves as a small bed and breakfast.

It was listed on the National Register of Historic Places in 2006.

References

Plantation houses in Virginia
Houses on the National Register of Historic Places in Virginia
Greek Revival houses in Virginia
Houses completed in 1842
Houses in Goochland County, Virginia
National Register of Historic Places in Goochland County, Virginia